Lyndall Harvey Barbour (19 May 1916 – 10 October 1986) was an Australian actress, primarily of radio, although she also added stage and television work (both series and made-for-television movies) to her repertoire. Born in Egypt to Australian parents, she was a three time recipient of the Macquarie Radio Network award.

Early life
Lyndall Harvey Barbour was born in Cairo, the daughter of Australian parents Eric Pitty Barbour and Dora Frances Blanche Barbour (Grieve). Both of her parents were born in New South Wales. Her father was serving in the Royal Australian Army Medical Corps during World War I at the time of her birth. She was raised in Sydney, attending the Church of England Girls Grammar School, before earning a bachelor's degree at the University of Sydney in 1938, and joined the dramatic society under the engagement of May Hollinworth

Career
Barbour began acting while in college, and whilst attending auditions in 1937, she was scouted by Edward Howell and studied drama with his wife Therese Desmond. She soon found a niche as a radio actress for the Australian Broadcasting Commission, and later 2GB. Casting director Val Vine commented that "Lyndall Barbour was so technically correct, she never missed a comma." She was heard in over three hundred radio plays and serials, including Malcolm Afford's World War II drama First Light Fraser. She won Macquarie Awards as best supporting actress in 1946 and 1948, and as best actress in 1949, for Genius at Home.  From 1954 to 1970 she starred in the Australian version of the soap opera Portia Faces Life, as Portia Manning, a successful lawyer. She appeared in the television series You Can't See 'Round Corners in 1967 and the film version in 1969.

Later in life Barbour recorded audiobooks for the Royal Blind Society of New South Wales. She also appeared in stage and television roles, the latter particularly in the 1960s after radio work became scarce. She won a best actress award from the Sydney Theatre Critics' Circle in 1956 for her work in The Rose Tattoo. Her last film appearance was in 1981, in Maybe This Time, starring Judy Morris.

Personal life
Barbour died at Wahroonga, New South Wales in 1986, aged 70.

Filmography

References

External links

1916 births
1986 deaths
20th-century Australian actresses
University of Sydney alumni
Australian expatriates in Egypt